North Lebanon may refer to:
North Governorate, Lebanon
North Lebanon Township, Lebanon County, Pennsylvania